Brânză de coșuleț is a salty type of cheese, with sheep's-milk cheese from Romania, specific of Transylvania. Brânză de coșuleț has a strong flavour and slightly soft in texture. To obtain it, sweet caș is cut into small pieces, salted and then hand-mixed in a large wooden bowl. The mixture is then stuffed into bellows of fir tree bark, very lightly smoked. The cheese gets a specific pine resin flavour.

See also
 List of smoked foods

Notes and references 

Romanian cheeses
Smoked cheeses